Bandar Sulawesi Tengah Football Club (simply known as Bandar Sulteng FC) is an Indonesian football club based in Donggala Regency, Central Sulawesi. They currently compete in the Liga 3.

Honours
 Liga 3 Central Sulawesi
 Runner-up: 2021

References

External links

Football clubs in Indonesia
Football clubs in Central Sulawesi
Association football clubs established in 2010
2010 establishments in Indonesia